The 1971 Gent–Wevelgem was the 33rd edition of the Gent–Wevelgem cycle race and was held on 31 March 1971. The race started in Ghent and finished in Wevelgem. The race was won by Georges Pintens of the Hertekamp team.

General classification

References

Gent–Wevelgem
1971 in road cycling
1971 in Belgian sport
March 1971 sports events in Europe